Mark Sisson (born July 1953) is an American fitness author, food blogger, and a former distance runner, triathlete and Ironman competitor.

Biography
Sisson was born in Maine and is the oldest of four siblings. He attended Williams College, where he was a pre-med candidate and earned a biology degree.

Sisson is married to his wife Carrie. They have two children. Sisson is a follower of the paleo diet and markets his own version of it, called the "Primal Blueprint" diet. As part of this initiative, he started a food blog, "Mark's Daily Apple", in 2006 and has also written a number of diet and exercise books, including the best-selling book, The Keto Reset Diet: Reboot Your Metabolism in 21 Days and Burn Fat Forever.

Sisson finished 4th in the February 1982 Ironman World Championship. In the 1970s, he was a record-setting runner for the Portland (Maine) Track Club. He had a top-5 finish in the 1980 U.S. National Marathon Championships and earned a qualifying spot for the 1980 U.S. Olympic Trials.

Sisson served for 15 years as chairman of the International Triathlon Union (ITU) Anti-Doping Commission and as the ITU's liaison to the International Olympic Committee.  He was asked to step down from the roles due to conflict of interest in 2003 when he started his own dietary supplement company, Primal Nutrition.

Primal Kitchen
In 2015, Sisson and Morgan Buehler co-founded Primal Kitchen, "...an authentic, premium and growing brand that ... offer[s] health-conscious consumers the best possible choices in Condiments, Sauces, Dressings and Healthy Snacks." In 2018, Kraft Heinz announced a definitive agreement to acquire Primal Kitchen for approximately $200 million.

Bibliography
 The Primal Blueprint (2009)
 The New Primal Blueprint (2016)
 The Keto Reset Diet (2017)
 Primal Endurance (2015)
 Two Meals a Day (2021)

References

External links 

American male triathletes
People from Malibu, California
Writers from Maine
Williams College alumni
Paleolithic diet advocates
Sportspeople from Maine
Living people
1953 births